Nakazato Dam is a dam in Mie Prefecture, Japan, completed in 1976.

References

External links
 Nakazato Dam - Network camera

Dams in Mie Prefecture
Dams completed in 1976